Shinyanga Rural District is one of the five districts of the Shinyanga Region of Tanzania.  It is bordered to the north by the Shinyanga Urban District, to the east by the Kishapu District, to the south by the Tabora Region, and to the west by the Kahama District.

According to the 2002 Tanzania National Census, the population of the Shinyanga Rural District was 277,518.

Wards
The Shinyanga Rural District is administratively divided into 16 wards:

 Didia
 Ilola
 Imesela
 Iselamagazi
 Itwangi
 Lyabukande
 Mwakitolyo
 Mwamala
 Mwantini
 Pandagichiza
 Salawe
 Samuye
 Solwa
 Tinde
 Usanda
 Usule

Sources
 Shinyanga Rural District Homepage for the 2002 Tanzania National Census

Districts of Shinyanga Region